Gautam Shrestha (born 21 February 2002) is a Nepali footballer who plays as a defender for Nepali club Pokhara Thunders and the Nepal national team.

References

External links
 

Living people
2000 births
Nepalese footballers
Nepal international footballers
Association football defenders